"Walking with Elephants" is a song by Lithuanian producer Ten Walls. It was released as a digital download on 13 April 2014 by German record label BOSO and on 28 April 2014 in the United Kingdom. The song peaked to number 6 on the UK Singles Chart and also charted in Belgium. It was one of the most popular songs in Ibiza in 2014.

Music video
A music video to accompany the release of "Walking with Elephants" was first released onto YouTube on 3 September 2014 at a total length of three minutes and two seconds.

Track listing

Chart performance

Weekly charts

Year-end charts

Release history

References

2014 singles
2014 songs
House music songs
Instrumentals
Warner Records singles